Richard Eric Soule (born 5 September 1966, in Launceston, Tasmania) is a former Australian cricketer, who played for Tasmania. He played for Tasmania from 1983 until 1991.

He was a talented wicket-keeper, who played well during Tasmania's dark period in the 1980s when the side struggled for any success, and was also reliable lower order batsman.

See also
 List of Tasmanian representative cricketers

External links
Cricinfo Profile

1966 births
Living people
Australian cricketers
Tasmania cricketers
Wicket-keepers